is a mountain on the border between Niigata Prefecture and Gunma Prefecture in Japan. The mountain is listed as one of the 100 Famous Japanese Mountains in a 1964 book by mountaineer/author Kyūya Fukada.

References

Mountains of Niigata Prefecture
Mountains of Gunma Prefecture